Acanthomyrmex foveolatus is a species of ant that belongs to the genus Acanthomyrmex. It was described by Moffett in 1986, and is found in Indonesia.

References

foveolatus
Insects described in 1986
Insects of Indonesia